Layin' da Smack Down is the third studio album by rapper Project Pat, released on August 6, 2002. It is the last LP by Project Pat as well as by Hypnotize Minds to be released through Loud, as Loud was sold off to Sony. Due to Project Pat's incarceration at the time, promotion for the album was very limited, and did not receive an RIAA Certification. However, the album did make it to #12 on the Billboard 200 with over 70,000 copies sold in its first week of release.

There were three singles released from this album: "Make Dat Azz Clap", "County Jail" and "Choose U".

A music video was done for "Make Dat Azz Clap", most notable as Thang Clap.

The album also had a clean version available.

Track listing
 "Still Ridin' Clean" (featuring Juicy J) - 3:37
 "The Porch 3" - 0:52
 "Fight" - 5:29
 "Weak Niggaz" (featuring DJ Paul) - 4:41
 "Make Dat Azz Clap (Back Clap)" (featuring Juvenile) - 3:48
 "Choose U" - 3:15
 "Smokin' Out" (featuring Lord Infamous) - 3:20
 "Show Dem Golds" (featuring DJ Paul & Juicy J) - 4:31
 "This Pimp" - 3:41
 "On Nigga" - 4:16
 "That Drank" - 4:27
 "MC Flyjo" - 1:49
 "Posse Song" (featuring Hypnotize Camp Posse) - 3:42
 "90 Days" - 3:15
 "Shut Ya Mouth, Bitch" (featuring DJ Paul, Juicy J, Crunchy Black & Frayser Boy) - 5:25
 "Take Da Charge" - 3:06
 "Smoke & Get High" (featuring Crunchy Black) - 3:44
 "County Jail" - 3:54
 "I'm Mo" (featuring Lord Infamous, DJ Paul & Frayser Boy) - 4:17
 "Outro" - 1:37

Disc 2 (bonus disc)
 "Bonus CD Intro" (performed by DJ Paul & Juicy J) - 0:17
 "Juicy J Intro" (performed by Juicy J) - 0:20
 "North, North Part 2" (performed by Juicy J featuring Project Pat) - 3:41
 "DJ Paul Intro" (performed by DJ Paul) - 0:08
 "You Scared" (performed by DJ Paul) - 3:28
 "Crash da Club" (performed by Lil Wyte) - 4:31
 "Mouth Write a Check (Intro)" (performed by DJ Paul) - 0:08
 "Mouth Write a Check" (performed by Frayser Boy featuring Project Pat) - 3:38

Charts

Weekly charts

Year-end charts

References

2002 albums
Project Pat albums
Loud Records albums
Albums produced by DJ Paul
Albums produced by Juicy J